Sochan may refer to

People
Jeremy Sochan (born 2003), Polish basketball player
Pavol Socháň (1862-1941), Slovakian photographer, ethnographer, writer and artist
  (born 1977), Canadian ice hockey player
  (born 1910), Polish politician
Zygmunt Sochan (1909-1998), Polish football player, member of the Polish resistance movement in World War II

Plants
 Sochan, a common name for Rudbeckia laciniata

Polish-language surnames